Verein für Leibesübungen Wolfsburg e. V., commonly known as VfL Wolfsburg, is a German women's football club based in Wolfsburg, Lower Saxony. The club is currently playing in the top division of Germany the Bundesliga. The club has won the UEFA Women's Champions League in 2013 and 2014.

History

VfR Eintracht Wolfsburg was founded in 1973. The team was a founding member of the Bundesliga. In 2003 the team joined VfL Wolfsburg.

The first season under the new name was in 2003–04, which ended with an eighth place, the next season the team was relegated to the 2nd Bundesliga in 12th place but gained direct promotion in the following 2005–06 season. After a fifth place in 2009–10, Wolfsburg grew up one year later, contending for the title and managed to be runner-up in 2011–12.

In the 2012–13 season Wolfsburg won the UEFA Women's Champions League. Two weeks prior the team achieved its first Bundesliga title. They were the second team, after 1. FFC Frankfurt to complete the treble, by also winning the domestic cup competition. This was the first time that the same year both in men's and women's football, clubs from the same nation, complete the treble, with the men's club being Bayern Munich. They were also the first German football team to successfully defend their Champions League title.

Players

Current squad

Former players

Personnel

Current technical staff

Management

Board of directors

{| class="wikitable"
|-
!Office
!Name
|-
|rowspan=3|Managing Director
|  Michael Meeske
|-
|  Jörg Schmadtke
|-
|  Tim Schumacher
|-
| Sporting director
|  Ralf Kellermann
|-

Honours

Official
UEFA Women's Champions League:
 Winners (2): 2012–13, 2013–14
 Runners up: 2015–16, 2017–18, 2019–20
Frauen-Bundesliga:
 Winners (7): 2012–13, 2013–14, 2016–17, 2017–18, 2018–19, 2019–20, 2021–22
DFB Pokal:
 Winners (9): 2012–13, 2014–15, 2015–16, 2016–17, 2017–18, 2018–19, 2019–20, 2020–21, 2021–22

Invitational
Ladies First Cup:
 Winners: 2013

Individual Club Awards
 IFFHS World's Best Woman Club:
 Winners: 2013, 2014

Record in UEFA Women's Champions League
All results (away, home and aggregate) list Wolfsburg's goal tally first.

f First leg.

References

External links

VfL Wolfsburg
Women's football clubs in Germany
Football clubs in Lower Saxony
2003 establishments in Germany
Association football clubs established in 2003
Frauen-Bundesliga clubs